The British Columbia Rugby Hall of Fame, set in Vancouver, British Columbia, Canada, is a Hall of Fame created in 2005 to honour those who have contributed more to the progress of the sport of rugby union in Canada from the province of British Columbia, one of their country's where the oval sport is more popular and as a larger fan base.

The British Columbia Rugby Hall of Fame as currently 21 inductees, which include Canadian rugby union legends Gareth Rees and Mark Wyatt.

External links
British Columbia Rugby Hall of Fame

Rugby union museums and halls of fame
Halls of fame in Canada
Canadian sports trophies and awards
Awards established in 2005
Hall
British Columbia awards
2005 establishments in British Columbia